Stryphnaula is a genus of moths of the family Yponomeutidae.

Species
Stryphnaula capnanthes - Meyrick, 1938 

Yponomeutidae